Begri Girls High School is a Bengali-medium girls' school located in Domjur, Howrah district in the Indian state of West Bengal. It offers upper primary, secondary, and higher secondary education. The school was established in the year 1964 and is managed by the Department of Education. 

There are a total of 1074 students attending Begri Girls High School. Fifteen teachers and three non-teaching staff work at the school. The student-teacher ratio is 57.00000, while the student classroom ratio is 67.00000.  Begri Girls High School has a 100.00000 pass percentage

Facilities
Begri Girls High School has 16 classrooms and 4 other rooms. There are 14 blackboards and 9 computers. The library has 60 books.

See also
Education in India
List of schools in India
Education in West Bengal

References

 http://www.schoolsworld.in/schools/showschool.php?school_id=19161423902

External links 

Girls' schools in West Bengal
Primary schools in West Bengal
High schools and secondary schools in West Bengal
Schools in Howrah district
Educational institutions established in 1964
1964 establishments in West Bengal